Sergio Bravo Martínez (born 27 November 1927) is a Mexican former football defender who was in Mexico's squad for the 1954 FIFA World Cup.

Career
Bravo was an imposing central defender who played his club football with Club León. He retired from playing in January 1964.

References

External links
FIFA profile

1927 births
Possibly living people
Mexico international footballers
Association football defenders
Club León footballers
1954 FIFA World Cup players
Footballers from Mexico City
Mexican footballers